The Austrasian Letters is a collection of 48 Latin letters sent from or to Austrasia between the 470s and 590s. The collection is transmitted in a single 9th-century manuscript from the Abbey of Lorsch.

The collection was probably assembled in Metz in the late 6th century. It has been attributed to Bishop Magneric of Trier, who was a counsellor of King Childebert II in the 580s. It is generally thought that the compilation was made for the use of the Austrasian chancery. Recently, however, it has been argued that the compilation was only brought together in the early 9th century at Lorsch.

The letters give insight into the workings of Frankish diplomacy and life at the Austrasian court. The letters give insights into the literacy of the kings' inner circle, along with snippets of information not supplied by other sources of the period. They provide more contemporary evidence for the reign of Clovis I than any other source. The letters are particularly useful in illuminating the complex diplomatic relations between Austrasia and the Byzantine Empire. A majority of the letters concern this relationship.

Table of letters

Editions

Notes

Bibliography

Medieval documents
Merovingian period
Diplomatic correspondence
Medieval letter collections